"Run to the Hills" is a song by Swedish singer Klara Hammarström, released as a single on 26 February 2022. It was performed in Melodifestivalen 2022 and made it to the final on 12 March 2022. It reached number one in Sweden on 11 March 2022.

Track listing

Charts

Weekly charts

Year-end charts

References

2022 songs
2022 singles
Melodifestivalen songs of 2022
Number-one singles in Sweden
Songs written by Wrethov
Songs written by Jimmy Thörnfeldt